Costanza Bonaccorsi (born 30 December 1994) is an Italian female canoeist who won at senior level the Wildwater Canoeing World Championships.

References

External links
 Costanza Bonaccorsi at ICF 

1994 births
Living people
Italian female canoeists
Place of birth missing (living people)